This is a list of the England women's national football team results from 2000 to 2009.

Results

2000

2001

2002

2003

2004

2005

2006

2007

2008

2009 

2000s in England
2000s